Third Verse is the third album of Christian rock band Smalltown Poets. It was released in 2000.

Track listing
 "Every Reason" - 3:43
 "Any Other Love" - 4:05
 "Firefly" - 3:37
 "Clean" - 4:37
 "The Lust, the Flesh, the Eyes and the Pride of Life" - 4:18
 "Waterfall" - 4:15
 "Beautiful, Scandalous Night" - 3:55
 "No Kinder Savior" - 4:20
 "That Line" - 4:59
 "100 Billion Watts" - 3:34

Tracks
 "The Lust, the Flesh, the Eyes and the Pride of Life" is a cover from the 77s.

Personnel
Michael Johnston - vocals, guitars
Miguel DeJesús - bass guitar
Matt Goldman - drums, percussion and loops
Terry Flanigan - guitars

References 

Smalltown Poets albums
2000 albums